Edward Cook may refer to:

Edward Rider Cook (1836–1898), English soap manufacturer and Liberal Party politician
Edward Dutton Cook (1829–1883), English dramatic critic and author
Edward Cook (athlete) (1888–1972), American athlete
Edward Tyas Cook (1857–1919), English journalist, biographer, and man of letters
Edward H. Cook (born 1935), American businessman from Oklahoma
Edward A. Cook (born 1994), English Civil Engineer of the 21st century

See also
Ed Cook (disambiguation)
Eddie Cook (disambiguation)
Ted Cook (disambiguation)
Edward Cooke (disambiguation)
Edward Coke (disambiguation), same pronunciation